Silent Treatment is the third studio album from Arizona hardcore band The Bled.

Pre-order
People who pre-ordered the album through interpunk.com received a limited edition, green vinyl print of the album along with the cd, limited to 300. This was changed to a 2 LP press a day before the official release of the album, causing a week delay in shipping. Pre-orders were shipped out on Friday, October 4, 2007. The vinyl is translucent green.

Track listing

Bonus tracks
"Catholic Schoolgirl Blues"

Remixes
"Asleep on the Frontlines (Appliantz Remix)" - 5:33 On the Resident Evil: Extinction Soundtrack

Appearances
The track "Starving Artiste" was featured on the Tony Hawk's Proving Ground soundtrack.

Credits
James Munoz - vocals
Ross Ott - guitar
Michael Pedicone - drums
Darren Simoes - bass
Jeremy Talley - guitar
Morning Breath Inc. - art direction, design
2 FAKE - 3D rendering
Chris Phelps - photography
Stephen Looker – management

References

The Bled albums
Vagrant Records albums
2007 albums